{{DISPLAYTITLE:C18H18N2O}}
The molecular formula C18H18N2O (molar mass: 278.348 g/mol) may refer to:

 AC-262,536
 Demexiptiline
 Mariptiline
 Proquazone

Molecular formulas